The Improvement Era (often shortened to The Era) was an official magazine of the Church of Jesus Christ of Latter-day Saints (LDS Church) between 1897 and 1970.

History
The Improvement Era was first published in 1897 as a replacement to the unofficial magazine, The Contributor. Over the years, it was the official publishing organ for a variety of organizations within the Church of Jesus Christ of Latter-Day Saints, including the Seventies, the Young Men's Mutual Improvement Association, the Young Ladies' Mutual Improvement Association, priesthood quorums, church schools, the Church Music Committee, and the Home Teaching Committee.
In the July 1960 issue, an insert targeted toward the teenagers of the church was included. Entitled "The Era of Youth," it continued to be included in the Improvement Era until 1970, when it became the basis for the New Era.

With the implementation of the Priesthood Correlation Program in 1970, the Improvement Era ceased publication and was replaced by the New Era and the Ensign.

Editors of the Improvement Era included Joseph F. Smith, Heber J. Grant, George Albert Smith, David O. McKay, Joseph Fielding Smith, John A. Widtsoe, Richard L. Evans, B. H. Roberts, Edward H. Anderson, Hugh J. Cannon, Harrison R. Merrill, and Doyle L. Green.

Notable articles
The February 1968 issue included the first publication of images of the Joseph Smith Papyri, in sepia tone.

See also

 Elaine A. Cannon
 Ardyth Kennelly
 Young Woman's Journal
 List of Latter Day Saint periodicals

References

External links
 Complete issues of Improvement Era, Church History Library and the Internet Archive.
 An index to poetry and prose in Improvement Era, Mormon Literature and Creative Arts Database of Brigham Young University.

1897 in Christianity
Monthly magazines published in the United States
The Church of Jesus Christ of Latter-day Saints periodicals
Defunct magazines published in the United States
Magazines established in 1897
Magazines disestablished in 1970
1897 establishments in Utah
1970 disestablishments in Utah
Magazines published in Utah
Young Men (organization)
Young people and the Church of Jesus Christ of Latter-day Saints
Young Women (organization)